Carex palawanensis is a tussock-forming perennial in the family Cyperaceae. It is native to parts of Asia.

See also
 List of Carex species

References

palawanensis
Plants described in 1911
Taxa named by Georg Kükenthal
Flora of Borneo
Flora of the Philippines